Yann Eliès (born 31 January 1974 in Saint-Brieuc, Côtes-d'Armor) is a French professional sailor. He competed in the 2008-2009 Vendee Globe where he was evacuated from his yacht South of Australia after being incompacitated due to a fractured femur. He returned for the 2016-2017 Vendée Globe finishing 5th.

Sailing career highlights

References

External links
 
 
 
 
 

1974 births
Living people
Sportspeople from Saint-Brieuc
French male sailors (sport)
IMOCA 60 class sailors
French Vendee Globe sailors
2008 Vendee Globe sailors
2016 Vendee Globe sailors
Vendée Globe finishers
Single-handed circumnavigating sailors